Nell Regan is an internationally renowned Irish based poet and non fiction writer.

Life
Regan was born in London in 1969 but grew up in Dublin, Ireland. She was educated in University College Dublin, Lancaster University and Goldsmiths, University of London. She is a graduate of The Poets’ House, Donegal.
Regan has worked as a documentary researcher. She teaches in Dublin. In 2013 Regan  was made artistic director of the West Cork Literary Festival.

In 2011, she participated in the International Writing Program Fall Residency at the University of Iowa in Iowa City, IA.

Awards
 2007 Dublin City Council Bursary for Literature
 2012 Fulbright Fellowship
 2010 Arts Council An Chomhairle Ealaíon Literature Bursary
 in 2011 she was Writer in Residence at the International Writing Programme, Iowa
 In 2013 Writer in Residence at the Centre Culturel Irlandais, Paris.
 2016 Kavanagh Fellowship
 She has also been shortlisted for the Glen Dimplex New Writing Awards, Strong Awards and Patrick Kavanagh Awards.

Themes
Regan's poetry draws from  the issues she is interested in, like history, culture and nature and she has been commissioned by organisations like Cork County Council's Fort Camden Commission.

Bibliography

Poetry

 Preparing for Spring (Galway, Arlen House, 2007/New York, Syracuse University Press, 2008)
 Bound for Home (Arlen House, 2011)
 One Still Thing (London, Enitharmon, 2014)
 Underworld (Belfast, Lapwing, 2004)

Non fiction
 Female Activists, Irish Women and Change, (Woodfield Press, 2001)
 Field Day Anthlogy Vol 4.

References 

 

Writers from London
Irish women novelists
Irish women poets
1969 births
Living people
21st-century Irish poets
21st-century Irish women writers
Alumni of University College Dublin
Alumni of Lancaster University
Alumni of Goldsmiths, University of London